Angelo Mannironi (born 9 August 1961) is an Italian weightlifter. He competed in the men's middleweight event at the 1988 Summer Olympics.

References

1961 births
Living people
Italian male weightlifters
Olympic weightlifters of Italy
Weightlifters at the 1988 Summer Olympics
Sportspeople from Rome
20th-century Italian people